Change of Address is the thirteenth rock album by British instrumental (and sometimes vocal) group The Shadows, released in 1980 through Polydor Records.

Track listing

Personnel
 Lead Guitar - Hank Marvin
 Rhythm Guitar - Bruce Welch
 Drums & Percussion - Brian Bennett
With
 Bass guitar - Alan Jones
 Piano, Electric Piano - Cliff Hall
 Synthesizer - Dave Lawson

Engineered by Peter Vince
Recorded at Abbey Road Studios, London and Radlett

Charts

References 

1980 albums
The Shadows albums
Polydor Records albums